Edward Riley Ives (September 13, 1839 – 1918) was an American toymaker from Connecticut. He married Jennie Blakeslee in 1866, and with the help of his father in law and brother in law, he founded the Ives Manufacturing Company two years later in 1868 in Plymouth, Connecticut. It became one of the largest toy companies in the United States during the 19th century and the early decades of the 20th century. Late in his career, he turned the company over to his son, Harry Ives.

Edward Ives was a distant cousin of U.S. classical music composer Charles Edward Ives. Ives and his son were the subject of a biography titled Messrs. Ives of Bridgeport, written by Louis Hertz and published in 1950.

1839 births
1918 deaths
People from Plymouth, Connecticut
19th-century American businesspeople